Luckin Coffee Inc. is a Chinese coffee company and coffeehouse chain. It was founded in Beijing in 2017. , it managed 5,671 kiosks. The company operates shops, stores, and kiosks that offer coffee, tea, and food. 
Customers need to download an app to order and pay for drinks online. The coffee chain headquarter is in Xiamen. Luckin Coffee quickly expanded over the years and outnumbered Starbucks in China by 2019.

In April 2020, the company revealed that it had inflated its 2019 sales revenue by up to US$310 million. It resulted in the stock price crashing and several executives being fired.  Trading was suspended and the company was delisted from NASDAQ on 29 June 2020. The company filed for Chapter 15 bankruptcy in the US in February 2021. In December 2021, Luckin Coffee received court approval from a federal judge in Manhattan to restructure $460M worth of debt and to settle a number of class-action lawsuits over the fabricated sales figures.

History

2017–2019: Founding 
Luckin Coffee was incorporated in October 2017, and by January 2018 had opened its first shops in Beijing and Shanghai. The company announced the completion of Series A financing to a total of US$200 million in July 2018 backed by Centurium Capital, Joy Capital and GIC.

By October 2018, the company had opened 1300 stores, surpassing the number of Costa Coffee stores to become the second-biggest coffee brand in China. Luckin Coffee also signed a strategic cooperation agreement with Tencent. Much of Luckin's expansion was fueled by an aggressive marketing strategy which saw the company spend three times as much as it earned to feed its growth.

In January 2019, the company announced that they planned to open 2500 new stores and surpass Starbucks to become the biggest coffee brand in China. Luckin also gained exposure in the US stock market, applying to the Nasdaq and starting to trade at $17 a share. After reaching $25.96 on the first day, the stock dropped to $16 on its second day of trading.

2020–2021: Accounting scandal 
In early January 2020, the company raised more capital through a share placement and a convertible bond sale, with worth totalling $821 million as it sought to expand into deploying vending machines that would serve fresh hot beverages and snacks. It was also offering a $400 million five-year convertible bond separately.

On 2 April 2020, the company announced that an internal investigation found that its chief operating officer, Jian Liu, had fabricated the company's 2019 sales by "around RMB2.2 billion" (US$310 million). The next day, the China Securities Regulatory Commission said that it would investigate the company for fraud. On 8 April, the U.S. stock market halted trading on all Luckin shares over the fraud probe. In the month of April, the company's stock fell by over 80%. In mid-April 2020, American investment bank Goldman Sachs announced that it would seize and sell the Luckin stock holdings of the company's chairman, Lu Zhengyao, after he defaulted on a $518 million margin loan. The $400 million bond offered just prior to Muddy Waters Research's release of the anonymous report also had imploded by 24 April 2020, with the notes selling as low as for 10 cents on the dollar value of bond.

On 15 May the company received a delisting notice from NASDAQ. After over a month of being halted for trading, the companies stock was able to be traded again on 20 May 2020. On 28 May, shares of the company plummeted more than 20% after The Wall Street Journal released a report claiming that firms linked to the company's chairman and controlling shareholder played a central role in its accounting scandal.  On 29 June 2020, the company suspended trading on NASDAQ and filed for delisting, after the exchange ordered the company to delist. Banks including Credit Suisse had won court orders in Cayman Islands on 22 June 2020, and in British Virgin Islands on 9 July 2020, to wind up Lu's controlling entities of Luckin Coffee Inc for liquidation, after Lu's margin loan default. The company thereby entered into a state of provisional liquidation.  In September 2020, China's markets regulators fined a group of firms including Luckin Coffee for a combined $8.98 million in relation to Luckin's falsification of financial and operational figures.  On 16 December 2020, the US SEC settled the accounting fraud case with the company for $180 million. The company agreed to the settlement without admitting or denying the SEC allegations which include defrauding investors by materially misstating revenue and expenses, inflating its growth rates and understating its losses. On 5 February 2021, the company filed for Chapter 15 bankruptcy in New York, less than a year after the company said that more than a quarter's worth of business may have been faked.  By 22 September 2021, the company revealed its plans to restructure.  On 30 September 2021, Luckin Coffee settled a US class-action lawsuit to resolve investors' claims for $187.5 million. In December 2021, Luckin received court approval to restructure a large amount of debt and settle a number of lawsuits over fabricated sales figures.

See also 

 Coffee culture
Coffee wars
 List of coffee companies
 List of coffeehouse chains

References

External links
 

Companies based in Xiamen
Coffeehouses and cafés in China
Fast-food chains of China
Chinese companies established in 2017
Food and drink companies established in 2017
Restaurants established in 2018
Restaurant chains in China
Chinese brands
Companies formerly listed on the Nasdaq
2019 initial public offerings
Accounting scandals
Companies traded over-the-counter in the United States
Companies that filed for Chapter 11 bankruptcy in 2021